Emmanuel-Frédéric-Gérard Rousseau (also known as Fra' Emmanuel Rousseau as a member of the Sovereign Military Order of Malta; born 30 June 1969) is a French archivist.

Life
Rousseau was born in Nancy in 1969, the son of Claude Rousseau, an engineer and an officer of the Order of Leopold II of Belgium.

He made his solemn vows as a full Knight of Justice on 11 May 2011 at the church Sainte-Élisabeth-de-Hongrie in Paris. A Knight Grand Cross of Justice, he was elected to a five-year term as a member of the Sovereign Council in May 2014. He was elected to a second five-year term as a member of the Sovereign Council in May 2019. That term ended when Pope Francis reorganized the leadership of the Sovereign Order of Malta on 3 September 2022 and appointed him Grand Commander of the Order of Malta. On 26 January 2023, he was elected to a six-year term in that office.

Rousseau is curator of the Magistral Libraries and Archives and Vice-President of the (French) Académie historique de l'Ordre de Malte.

Rousseau is President of the Historical Commission for the beatification of Empress Zita of Austria.

Publications
 With Étienne Martin and Bruno Martin: Saints et Bienheureux de l’Ordre de Malte, 2014.
 With Laure Peureux, Olivier Cubourg, and Hugues Lefort: "L’Ordre de Malte pendant la Première Guerre mondiale", Soins 59, no. 786 (juin 2014): 80–82.
 Introduction to Valeria Vanesio, Il valore inestimabile delle carte: l'archivio del Sovrano Militare Ordine di Malta e la sua storia: un primo esperimento di ricostruzione. Roma: Tip. Mariti, 2014.

Presentations
 "La vie spirituelle du Cardinal Tisserant", Colloque Le Cardinal Tisserant au service des Églises orientales, 21 octobre 2017, église Sainte-Élisabeth-de-Hongrie, Paris.

Honours
 Grand Officer, National Order of Merit, Romania, February 14, 2013.
 Professed Knight Grand Cross of Justice of Solemn Vows of the Sovereign Military Order of Malta, May 11, 2011.
 Grand Commander of the Sovereign Military Order of Malta, September 3, 2022.

Referenced

Additional sources 
 

Knights of Malta
Living people
People from Nancy, France
1969 births
French archivists
École Nationale des Chartes alumni